Quarley is a village and civil parish in the Test Valley district of Hampshire, England.

An Iron Age hillfort, Quarley Hill, lies immediately to the southwest.

References

External links

Quarley Village

Villages in Hampshire